Steven Crowell is an American philosopher and professor emeritus at Rice University, where he taught from 1983 to 2022.  Crowell earned his Ph.D. in Philosophy from Yale University in 1981. His work has largely focused on twentieth-century European philosophy, including phenomenology, existentialism, hermeneutics, and post-structuralism.

See also
 American philosophy
 List of American philosophers

Bibliography
 Normativity and Phenomenology in Husserl and Heidegger (Cambridge University Press, 2013)
 Transcendental Heidegger (Stanford University Press, 2007)
 Husserl, Heidegger, and the Space of Meaning: Paths Toward Transcendental Phenomenology (Evanston: Northwestern University Press, 2002)
 The Reach of Reflection: Issues for Phenomenology's Second Century, ed. Steven Crowell, Lester Embree, and Samuel Julian (Electron Press, 2001: www.electronpress.com)
 The Prism of the Self: Philosophical Essays in Honor of Maurice Natanson, ed. Steven Galt Crowell (Dordrecht: Kluwer, 1995)
 Nietzsche's View of Truth, International Studies in Philosophy XIX/2 (1987), 3–18.

References

External links
 http://www.ruf.rice.edu/~crowell

Living people
20th-century American philosophers
Rice University faculty
Yale Graduate School of Arts and Sciences alumni
Heidegger scholars
Nietzsche scholars
Phenomenologists
Hermeneutists
Husserl scholars
Year of birth missing (living people)
21st-century American philosophers